The Feeling is the fifth studio album by the British rock band The Feeling, released on 4 March 2016. The album's production was partly funded by fans via PledgeMusic, which offered pre-orders CD, vinyl, and deluxe formats of the album.

Recording
The album was recorded over ten days as a fully live band, abandoning standard studio availabilities such as click tracks, in order to capture the feel and spirit of a live band. The songs were all recorded one at a time in full takes. 
Vocalist Dan Gillespie-Sells said "This record captures a kind of energy you’d normally only get if you’ve seen us in concert. When we play live, the music is free and moving together as one whole. It can breathe a bit, and we can react to each other. But it’s hard to recreate that in the studio if you’re recording along to individual parts that were done separately the day before. We had to make sure all the microphones were in exactly the right places and that we really knew the material. But when it came to pressing record, it was just a really fired-up live band in a room playing together."

Track listing

Personnel
Dan Gillespie-Sells – vocals, guitars
Richard Jones – bass guitar
Kevin Jeremiah – guitars
Ciaran Jeremiah – keyboards/Hammond organ
Paul Stewart – drums

Charts

References

The Feeling albums
2016 albums
Albums produced by Seton Daunt